Frederick James Woodbridge, AIA, (May 18, 1900 – January 17, 1974), was an American architect. His projects were based in New York, New Jersey, and Connecticut. He was partners in the firms Evans, Moore & Woodbridge, Malmfeldt, Adams & Woodbridge, and Adams & Woodbridge (1945–1974), as well as being a sometime archeologist.

Early life and education
Born May 18, 1900 in Minneapolis, Minnesota. Woodbridge attended Phillips Exeter Academy, graduating in 1917, Amherst College, graduating in 1921, Columbia Graduate School of Architecture, Planning and Preservation, graduating in 1923, and the American Academy in Rome from 1923–1925. He was also the Boyer Research Fellow in Classical Archeology at the University of Michigan.

Architectural career
Woodbridge began his career at McKim, Mead & White, working there from 1921 to 1922, and as a draftsman there from 1925 to 1929. He was licensed in New York (1928), Connecticut (1930), New Jersey (1937), and nationally as NCARB (1939)  and commenced his practice as a partner in 1929

Within the AIA, he was the chairman for the Committee on Architectural Services, Vice Chairman for the Committee on Buildings Costs, Secretary for the New York Chapter Civilian Protection Committee from 1940–1941. He was the president of the Architectural League and secretary of its executive committee.

He was a member of the Plattsburg & Columbia S.A.T.C in 1918, U.S. Naval Reserve Lieutenant, Lt. Commander of the O. in C. Air Naval Training Unit, Naval and Air Station, Quonset from 1942–1945.

He was faculty at the Extension, School of Architecture, 1934-1942 as a critic in Design, Instructor in History of Architecture and Rendering, Lecturer on Design at the Institutional Residence Halls, of Teacher's College, Columbia University (1939–1942). He was the architect for excavations at Antioch of Pisidia, Turkey, and at Carthage, Tunisia, from 1924 to 1925.

Death
He died on January 17, 1974 (aged 73) in Manhattan, New York City.

References

External links
 Frederick J. Woodbridge architectural records and papers, 1921-1971. Held by the Department of Drawings & Archives, Avery Architectural & Fine Arts Library, Columbia University.

1900 births
1974 deaths
Architects from Minneapolis
Defunct architecture firms based in New York City
Architects from New York City
Amherst College alumni
Columbia Graduate School of Architecture, Planning and Preservation alumni
University of Michigan fellows
American ecclesiastical architects
Architects of cathedrals
Architects of Anglican churches
Architects of Presbyterian churches
Fellows of the American Institute of Architects
20th-century American architects